These are the results of the women's team all-around competition, one of six events for female competitors in artistic gymnastics at the 1988 Summer Olympics in Seoul.  The compulsory and optional rounds took place on September 19 and 21 at the Olympic Gymnastics Hall.

Results

The final score for each team was determined by combining all of the scores earned by the team on each apparatus during the compulsory and optional rounds.  If all six gymnasts on a team performed a routine on a single apparatus during compulsories or optionals, only the five highest scores on that apparatus counted toward the team total.

References
Official Olympic Report
www.gymnasticsresults.com
www.gymn-forum.net

Women's team all-around
1988 in women's gymnastics
Women's events at the 1988 Summer Olympics